Association Sportive Vita Club, more commonly known as AS Vita Club, AS V. Club or simply Vita Club, is a Congolese football club based in Kinshasa.

History
AS Vita Club was founded in 1935 by Honoré Essabe under the name of Renaissance in rue Usoke n° 73 in Kinshasa.

The name changed in 1939 into Diables Rouges, in 1942 into Victoria Club and finally in 1971 to Vita Club.
On 17 December 1976 it took the official statue of the omnisports club with many sections:
 Football
 Basketball
 Handball 
 Nantei
 Volleyball

Honours

AS Vita Club is one of the most successful teams of the DR Congo, having won many national and international titles.

National 
Linafoot
 Champions (15): 1970, 1971, 1972, 1973, 1975, 1977, 1980, 1988, 1993, 1997, 2003, 2010, 2014–15, 2017–18, 2020–21

Coupe du Congo
 Champions (8): 1971, 1972, 1973, 1975, 1977, 1981, 1982, 1983

Super Coupe du Congo
 Champions: 2015

International 

African Cup of Champions Clubs / CAF Champions League
 Champions: 1973

Performance in CAF competitions
African Cup of Champions Clubs / CAF Champions League: 14 appearances
The club have 8 appearances in African Cup of Champions Clubs from 1971 to 1995 and 6 appearances in CAF Champions League from 1998 till now.

1971 – Second Round
1973 – Champion
1974 – Second Round
1975 – Second Round
1978 – Semi-Finals

1981 – Finalist
1989 – Second Round
1995 – First Round
1998 – First Round
2004 – Second Round

2011 – First Round
2012 – First Round
2013 – First Round
2014 – Runners-up

CAF Confederation Cup: 3 appearances
2008 – First Round of 16
2009 – Group Stage
2010 – First Round of 16
2018 – Finalist

CAF Cup: 2 appearances
1996 – Semi-Finals
1999 – Second Round

CAF Cup Winners' Cup: 6 appearances

1976 – Semi-Finals
1979 – Quarter-Finals

1982 – Quarter-Finals
1983 – Quarter-Finals

1984 – Second Round
2002 – Quarter-Finals

References

External links

 
Football clubs in the Democratic Republic of the Congo
Football clubs in Kinshasa
Association football clubs established in 1935
1935 establishments in the Belgian Congo
Sports clubs in the Democratic Republic of the Congo
CAF Champions League winning clubs